The Vjosa or Aoös is a river in northwestern Greece and southwestern Albania. The main tributaries are Voidomatis, Sarantaporos, Drino and Shushicë.

The river arises in the Pindus mountains of Epirus, Greece, and generally flows northwest. It enters Albania near Çarshovë, and empties into the Adriatic Sea just north of Vlorë. Generally wild and unpolluted, the river is surrounded by the Vikos–Aoös National Park in Greece, and the Vjosa-Narta Protected Landscape near its mouth. In December 2020, the Albanian portion of the river was designated a "Managed Nature Reserve" by the government. There is a campaign by the environmentalist groups to designate the whole Albanian part of the course a national park, to guard against the prospective hydroelectric projects. However, the Vjosa Wild River National Park was ultimately created in 15 March 2023.

Name
The Vjosa is known by a number of different names. In antiquity it was called Aoös in Greek (e.g. in Eratosthenes' Geography), and Aous in Latin. In Albanian it is called Vjosë or Vjosa, while in Greece it is known by its ancient name (Αώος in modern orthography), in medieval Latin maps was called Viossa as well as Vovousa or Aias. In Greek is also known as Βοϊούσα (Voioussa, pronounced vo-i-Usa), especially in pre-20th century texts. According to historian Ap. Vakalopoulos (1977) the name Voioussa is the common Greek name of Aoos.

Vjosa is also a common female Albanian given name.

Geography

The river arises in the Pindus mountains of Epirus, Greece, near the village of Vovousa. It flows through the canyons of Vikos–Aoös National Park, and then through the town of Konitsa, where it is joined by the Voidomatis. It enters Albania near Çarshovë, where it is joined by the Sarantaporos, and then continues northwest through Përmet, Këlcyrë, and Tepelenë (where it is joined by the Drino), Memaliaj, Selenicë and Novoselë. It then flows into the Adriatic Sea northwest of Vlorë. The river's mouth is located within the boundaries of the Vjosa-Narta Protected Landscape. In December 2020, the Albanian portion of the Vjosa was designated a "Managed Nature Reserve" by the government.

The main tributaries of Vjosa are the Sarantaporos and Voidomatis in Greece, and the Drino and Shushicë in Albania,

The main cities and towns along the river are, in downstream order, Vovousa and Konitsa in Greece; and Përmet, Këlcyrë, Çarshovë, Tepelenë, Memaliaj, Selenicë and Novoselë in Albania.

Antiquity

In Greek mythology, Aous is an epithet or name of Adonis.  Aous was also the name of the first king of Cyprus. A river and a mountain in Cyprus were also named Aous.

Hecataeus (550–476 BC) refers to the river as Aias, the name Anios is used by Plutarch in Caesar,  while Polybius, Livy and Strabo use the term Aoös. The Thesprotian tribe of Parauaioi received their name from the river, as those living beside it. Pausanias writes of "sharks" in the river, as it flows through Thesprotia. It is mentioned as Avos by Stephanus of Byzantium in the sixth century AD.

In 274 BC Pyrrhus of Epirus defeated Antigonus II Gonatas near the river's banks. In 198 BC, Philip V of Macedon and the Roman Titus Quinctius Flamininus, clashed in the Battle of the Aous. In 170 BC a plot to kidnap Aulus Hostilius Mancinus was foiled by Molossians by mistake. In antiquity the river passed more to the north, towards where Fier lies today. Owing to an earthquake in the fourth century, it changed to its present course. The earthquake and changed river course led to the decline of the ancient Greek city of Apollonia.

Conservation

Greece
The Vikos–Aoös National Park ( Ethnikós Drymós Víkou–Aóou), created in 1973, is a national park in Epirus in northwestern Greece. The national park encompasses  of mountainous terrain, with numerous rivers, lakes, caves, canyons, and coniferous and deciduous forest.

Albania

In February 2005, the Albanian government made the Vjose-Narte wetlands a protected area. This legislation followed Albania's ratification of the Kyoto Protocol in December 2004. The river contributes water to the Vjosë-Levan-Fier irrigation canal, a canal that was built in the 1950s to irrigate the Myzeqe. In December 2020, the Albanian portion of the river was designated a "Managed Nature Reserve" by the Albanian government.

The Vjosa's potential for hydropower has attracted developers to submit proposal to planning authorities for dam projects along the river and its tributaries. By 2017, over 2000 dam projects had gained governmental approval on stretches of river throughout the Balkans, including the Vjosa's channel. Developers have met with opposition from European nature organisations including RiverWatch, EuroNatur, and EcoAlbania.

A 2012 study assessed the hydromorphology of the Balkan's rivers, taking into account the structural status of 35,000 river kilometres. The study showed that the region's rivers are largely intact, with 30% deemed pristine and 50% slightly modified.

In February 2020, a campaign to elevate the status of the Vjosa watershed to Vjosa National Park gained approval from 20 environmental groups under the leadership of EcoAlbania. The effort to create Europe's first wild river park and save 300 km of rivers and streams targeted several projects identified in a February 2021 proposal.

In September 2020, Albanian Prime Minister Edi Rama announced that a protected area will be created around the Vjosa. In December 2020, the Albanian government designated the Vjosa River as a "Managed Nature Reserve" or nature park. Environmental groups are skeptical of the level of protection afforded by "protected" status. A national park designation would prohibit hydroelectric projects, airports, and other development; a protected area designation would not.

In April 2021 a petition signed by Vjosa River scientists was delivered to Albanian President Ilir Meta. The scientists immediate concern is a plan by a Turkish-Albanian venture, Ayen ALB, to build a 50-metre high hydroelectric dam. It would be the first development to change the course of Albania's 200 kilometre portion of the river. The dam would flood areas populated with the 1,175 animal and plant species—some endangered. It would inundate farmland, destroy the river's fishery, and force thousands from their homes. Activists maintain that the government should focus on other less damaging renewable energy sources.

See also
List of rivers of Albania
List of rivers of Europe
List of rivers of Greece

References

External links

 Vjosa/Aoos River Ecomuseum Official Website

Rivers of Albania
Rivers of Greece
International rivers of Europe
 
Chaonia
Illyrian Albania
Labëria
Landforms of Ioannina (regional unit)
Rivers of Epirus (region)
Pindus
Braided rivers in Albania
Natura 2000 in Greece